Caldasia is a quarterly peer-reviewed open access scientific journal published by the Instituto de Ciencias Naturales (Universidad Nacional de Colombia) since 1940. Articles are written in Spanish or English. The journal covers biodiversity topics in a wide sense, including the documentation, understanding, or conservation of biological diversity and thus accepts papers on botany, zoology, ecology, biodiversity, biogeography, taxonomy, systematics, conservation, anthropology, and related disciplines. It publishes full papers, reviews, or short communications. The journal charges no publication fees to authors.

Abstracting and indexing

The journal is abstracted and indexed in Biological Abstracts, BIOSIS Previews, CAB Abstracts, Science Citation Index Expanded, Scopus, and The Zoological Record.

References

External links

Multilingual journals
Publications established in 1940
Biology journals
Quarterly journals
Creative Commons Attribution-licensed journals